George Augustus Golding (6 May 1906 – 30 August 1999) was an Australian runner who won a bronze medal in the 440 yd event at the 1930 British Empire Games. Together with his future wife Clare Dennis he competed in the 1932 Summer Olympics and placed sixth in the 400 metres; he was eliminated in the semi-finals in the 400 metre hurdles.

References

1906 births
1999 deaths
Australian male sprinters
Australian male hurdlers
Olympic athletes of Australia
Athletes (track and field) at the 1932 Summer Olympics
Commonwealth Games bronze medallists for Australia
Commonwealth Games medallists in athletics
Athletes (track and field) at the 1930 British Empire Games
20th-century Australian people
Medallists at the 1930 British Empire Games